Cerro Petaca is a large forested ridge in Amazonas state, Venezuela. It lies just west of the two high plateaus of Cerro Marahuaca and northeast of the massive Cerro Duida. Part of the Duida–Marahuaca Massif, it is entirely within the bounds of Duida–Marahuaca National Park.

See also
 Distribution of Heliamphora

References

Ridges
Landforms of Venezuela
Geography of Amazonas (Venezuelan state)